A community service register is a register maintained in every Indian police station for a non-cognisable offence.  If the offence is a cognizable offence, then a first information report (FIR) is created and registered.  A CSR is also called a daily diary report or diary report.

After filing a police complaint, the CSR receipt is used as a proof of filing a complaint in the police station and also for claiming insurance settlements.

External links 
 
 Lawyers Club India

Law enforcement in India